Hathuwa Raj was a chieftaincy belonging to Baghochia dynasty of Bhumihar Brahmins. It encompassed 1,365 villages, was inhabited by more than 391,000 people, and produced an annual rental of almost a million rupees. 
It was located in the Saran Division of Bihar. Earlier seats of the Raj included Huseypur, Kalyanpur, Balchowra and Baghoch. The Kalyanpur chieftaincy was subjugated by the Mughal Emperor Akbar during late 16th century.

History
The first reference to the Kalyanpur family arises in 1539 when a Bhumihar Brahmin king Raja Jay Mal provided asylum to Humayun after his defeat at the Battle of Chausa. He provided Humayun with food and fodder for his troops. Once Sher Shah Suri fully established his control over North India, he took stern action against Jay Mal who fled into the forest and engaged in rebellion. However, once Humayun reestablished himself, he granted four parganas to Jay Mal's grandson, Raja Jubraj Shahi. Jubraj Shahi later engaged in a conflict with the Afghan chief, Kabul Mohammed who Jubraj Shahi later defeated and killed in battle.
Sir Kishen Pratap Sahi Bahadur who was the Maharaja between 1874 and 1896 was an ascetic. Soon after his coronation, he set out on a pilgrimage to the shrines of Northern India. Later on he used to regularly go on travelling and pilgrimage, mostly in Benares.
Due to its central location, Hathwa was the seat of the raja's residential palace and its nearby villages housed most of the key retainers of the estate.

In addition to the estate Kachcheri (office), located in the Hathwa cluster of villages, were the estate manager's bungalow, the Diwan's house, the Hathwa Eden School, the post office, the Raj dispensary, the Durga medical hall and the temple called Gopal mandir.

By the 1840s Hathwa was described as having large bazaars and bi-weekly markets. By the early nineteenth century, there were forts, palaces, and several temples constructed. An early twentieth-century account describes Hathwa as an impressive standard market, its shops offering a range of agricultural and consumer goods and its specialists providing a variety of services. The presence of schools and temples further accentuated its centrality in the locality. The estate collected ₹1400 annually as professional tax from traders stationed at Hathwa.

The ruling family of Hathwa Raj were related to the Majhauli Raj of Gorakhpur district. However, the full genealogy of the Hathwa family has been lost as the farmans, nishads and parwanas were destroyed when Fateh Bahadur Sahi rebelled.

Durga Puja
Durga Puja was a major attraction for the Hathwa Raj family and all the family members would gather to worship their Durga at Thawe Mandir. Rituals consisted of the Maharaja traveling in a buggy to the Gopal Mandir, and then to the Sheesh Mahal for the annual durbar and onwards on an elephant for darshan of the Maiyya on Vijayadashmi. The Hathwa family still celebrates some of the customs including sacrificing buffaloes and goats during puja.

See also
Zamindars of Bihar

Notes

Further reading
 

History of Bihar
Zamindari estates
Hindu dynasties
Indian maharajas
Quasi-princely estates of India
States and territories disestablished in 1956
1956 disestablishments in India